Chelsey Lee (born 10 December 1989 in Miami, United States) is an American basketball player. She currently played for Beroe in First League of Bulgaria and Adriatic League.

She also played for CREFF Madrid, Phoenix Galați, Bucheon KEB Hana Bank, Haskovo 2012, Broni and ICIM Arad.

Rutgers statistics

Source

References

External links
 Profile at eurobasket.com
 Stats – biography

1989 births
Living people
Centers (basketball)
Basketball players from Miami
American women's basketball players
African-American basketball players
American expatriate basketball people in Spain
American expatriate basketball people in Romania
American expatriate basketball people in South Korea
American expatriate basketball people in Bulgaria
American expatriate basketball people in Italy
21st-century African-American sportspeople
21st-century African-American women
20th-century African-American people
20th-century African-American women